This is a list of a selection of musical compositions in just intonation composed since 1900.

See also
List of quarter tone pieces

References 

Just tuning and intervals
Just intonation